Protestant is the second and final studio album by American hardcore punk band Rorschach. It was released in 1993 through Wardance Records and Gern Blandsten. The most of the tracks off the album were written during the band's Europe tour.

The band's complex combination of metal and hardcore influenced many artists in the metalcore genre, including Converge guitarist Kurt Ballou.

The tracks on the album were featured on the 1995 compilation album, Autopsy. The track "Traditional" was covered by Krallice.

Critical reception
The album was inducted to Decibels Hall of Fame. Decibel wrote: "Protestants incendiary nature and bleach-into-open-wound sound—a metaphor for cramming Voivod angularity and the Jesus Lizard skronk into Judge hardcore and Melvins’ noise-doom—belies the fact that the album was created and recorded under less-than-ideal conditions."

Track listing

Personnel
Rorschach
 Tom Rusnak — bass
 Andrew Gormley — drums
 Keith Huckins — guitars
 Nick Forté — guitars
 Charles Maggio — vocals

Other staff
 Justine DeMetrick — cover art
 Cynthia MacAdams — cover art
 David Locke — engineering
 Peter Nusbaum — engineering
 OM-IS — layout
 Rick Essig — mastering

References

External links
 

1993 albums
Rorschach (band) albums